Waterport Reservoir is a reservoir located by Waterport, New York. Fish species present in the lake are brown trout, lake trout, atlantic salmon, coho salmon, chinook salmon, steelhead trout, and walleye. There is a beach launch off Waterport Road on the northeast shore.

References

Bodies of water of Orleans County, New York
Lakes of New York (state)
Lakes of Orleans County, New York